Siqueira Campos / Copacabana Station is a subway station on the Rio de Janeiro Metro that services the neighbourhood of Copacabana in the South Zone of Rio de Janeiro. It is one of the busiest stations in the city, with an average daily flux of 76 thousand passengers.

References

Metrô Rio stations
Railway stations opened in 2002
2002 establishments in Brazil